Mikel Odriozola Domínguez (born 25 May 1973 in Errenteria, Guipúzcoa) is a Spanish race walker.

Achievements

References

Spanish Olympic Committee

1973 births
Living people
Spanish male racewalkers
Sportspeople from Gipuzkoa
Athletes (track and field) at the 2000 Summer Olympics
Athletes (track and field) at the 2008 Summer Olympics
Athletes (track and field) at the 2012 Summer Olympics
Olympic athletes of Spain
People from Errenteria
Athletes from the Basque Country (autonomous community)